Ukraine International Airlines PJSC, often shortened to UIA, is the flag carrier and the largest airline of Ukraine, with its head office in Kyiv and its main hub at Kyiv's Boryspil International Airport. It operates domestic and international passenger flights and cargo services to Europe, the Middle East, the United States, Canada, and Asia.

History

Early history
 

It was established as an alternative to Ukraine Airlines, a remnant of the Soviet Era in which each country had an operating airline under financial and commercial control of Aeroflot's main office in Moscow until the Soviet Union broke up and the airliners on the ground at each airport became the property of the state in which they were grounded. In early 1992, the then Minister for aviation in Ukraine reached an agreement on the lease of 2 B737-400's from GPA and the establishment of a new airline to operate at "internationally acceptable standards of Safety, Reliability, and Service between Ukraine and Europe."

In September, 1992 GPA and the new airline appointed Dublin-based International Aviation consultancy Avia International to lead the establishment and launch of the airline. Working closely with selected ex-staff of Ukraine Airlines, the joint team succeeded in launching flights to multiple destinations on schedule, beginning with a Kyiv-London flight on 25 November 1992. Other routes inaugurated in this period connected Kyiv with Berlin, Paris, Frankfurt, Vienna, and Amsterdam.

It became one of the first "joint ventures with foreign capital" in Ukraine and the first airline in the former Soviet Union to use then-new Boeing 737-400. The founding shareholders were the Ukrainian Association of Civil Aviation and Guinness Peat Aviation (GPA), an Irish aircraft-leasing company.

The airline began cargo operations with a Boeing 737-200 on 13 November 1994 to London and Amsterdam.

In 1996, Austrian Airlines and Swissair became shareholders, investing US$9 million in new equity.

In 2000, the European Bank for Reconstruction and Development became a shareholder by investing $5.4 million. In 2006, UIA adopted a new classification system for freight operations which allowed the airline to carry a wider range of goods, ranging from live animals to fresh food and valuable objects. Additionally, an express service was introduced to meet the needs of customers wishing to make use of expedited cargo-delivery services.

Developments since 2013

In the first half of 2013, the airline's patronage rose by 60% to  passengers. According to the company's president, Yuri Miroshnikov, UIA planned to achieve the same 2013 yearly results (i.e. to reach annual patronage of ). Also in 2013, due to the demise of competitor Aerosvit, UIA launched new flights from Ukraine to Baku, Azerbaijan; Yerevan, Armenia; Larnaca, Cyprus; Munich, Germany; Warsaw, Poland; Vilnius, Lithuania; Prague, Czech Republic; Athens, Greece; Batumi, Georgia; Moscow (Sheremetyevo Airport), Yekaterinburg, Saint Petersburg, Kaliningrad, Nizhnevartovsk, Novosibirsk, Rostov-on-Don, and Sochi in Russia; and Bishkek, Kyrgyzstan. On 25 April 2014, UIA began non-stop flights from Kyiv to John F. Kennedy International Airport in New York City, United States.

In October 2015 the Russian government banned UIA from flying to Russian destinations as a response to a ban by the Ukrainian government on Russian airlines flying into Ukraine.

Since June 2016, most of UIA's international flights are sold with the basic "hand luggage-only tariff." If passengers booking this tariff want to check-in luggage, the airline charges fees up to US$60 per flight. Also, since the northern-hemisphere summer of 2016, UIA wet-leased an ERJ 145 from Dniproavia (also part of the Privat Group) for daily services to Chernivtsi (because the condition of the airport there doesn't allow E-190 and B737-operations).

On 14 June 2016, the National Anti-Corruption Bureau of Ukraine had the offices of UIA searched because of an investigation by the Bureau into passenger fees not paid to the State Aviation Fund.

In March 2018, Ukraine International announced a fleet modernization plan. While the first of three pre-owned Boeing 777-200ERs had already been delivered, the airline expected several new Boeing 737 and Embraer 195 aircraft during the year to replace its last Boeing 737 Classics.

Ukraine International ceased its membership of the Flying Blue rewards program on January 1, 2019. UIA expected losses of approximately US$50 million for 2019 and therefore implemented saving measures, according to the new CEO.

In September 2021, UIA announced plans to add two Boeing 777-300s to their fleet, primarily for charter operations.

During early 2022 Russia invaded Ukraine, which led to the Ukrainian government closing Ukraine's air space for commercial airline operations, severely affecting Ukraine International's own operations. The airline suspended their flights from 24 February of that year, hoping to restart them by 23 March, before extending the suspension until the end of May 2022. Further extensions of the suspension were periodically announced, with the most recent extension in effect through 10 April 2023.

Corporate affairs
In February 2011, the Ukrainian government sold its 61.6% stake in UIA to three existing minority shareholders for UAH 287 million  (US$36.2 million). As of 26 July 2013, the airline was owned by Ukraine-based Capital Investment Project LLC (74%) and Cyprus-based Ontobet Promotions Limited (26%). Capital Investment Process, in turn, is owned by Ontobet. The owners are represented by Aron Mayberg, a business partner of Igor Kolomoyskyi and the former CEO of the bankrupt AeroSvit Airlines, from which partially licences and planes were transferred to Ukraine International Airlines.

As of 22 June 2016, the ownership structure is registered as the following: 74.1627% Capital Investment Project, Ukraine and 15.9108% Ontobet Promotions Ltd, Cyprus.

2016 was the second year in a row that the company made a loss, despite seeing growth in passengers. According to a February statement by company head Yuri Miroshnikov, UIA was struggling to stay profitable in the face of growing competition from budget airlines. In 2017, the company recorded a UAH 304 million loss.

Ukraine International Airlines posted a net loss of almost UAH 2.7 billion (about $100 million) in 2018, or about nine times more than it lost in 2017, Ukrainian media reported on 25 March, citing a UIA investor report.

Ukraine International Airlines (UIA), the country's national carrier, is to slow down its expansion plans in order to stabilise its financial performance and climb out of the red.

Yuri Miroshnikov is stepping down as president of Ukraine International Airlines (UIA) on 12 September after 15 years of managing Ukraine's national carrier and working for UIA since 1993. Yevhenii Dykhne will take on the leadership role at UIA from 18 September 2019.

The head of the state air traffic regulator of Ukraine stated at 8 November 2019 that UIA would owe them 1 billion UAH of unpaid fees and penalties.

Destinations

UIA connects Ukraine to over 80 destinations in Europe, Asia and the Middle East, as well as to New York City and Toronto from its base at Boryspil Airport, and also operates domestic flights. UIA serves over 1000 flights per week.
Ukraine International Airlines (UIA) was forced to make some involuntary changes to its summer 2019 flight schedules, with reduced frequencies and capacity on some selected routes. Although not officially a budget airline, many of UIA's worldwide flights are popular with travellers because of its low fares, they use Boryspil International Airport as a transport hub. 

Due to ongoing losses, the airline suspended flights to Amman, Riga, Beijing and Minsk in November 2019. From 2020, flights to Bangkok and Krakow were also suspended.

Codeshare agreements
Ukraine International Airlines has codeshare agreements with the following airlines:

Air Astana
Air France 
Air Moldova
airBaltic 
Austrian Airlines
Azerbaijan Airlines
EgyptAir
Iberia
KLM 
TAP Air Portugal
Turkish Airlines

Fleet

Current fleet

, the Ukraine International Airlines fleet consists of the following aircraft:

Former fleet

Ukraine International Airlines previously consisted of the following aircraft:

Accidents and incidents
On 8 January 2020, Ukraine International Airlines Flight 752 was shot down by the Islamic Revolutionary Guard Corps (IRGC) of Iran shortly after takeoff from Tehran Imam Khomeini International Airport. The IRGC attributed it to human error. The aircraft involved, UR-PSR, was a three-year-old Boeing 737-800. There were 176 passengers and crew on board with no survivors. The crash was the first fatal aviation incident for Ukraine International Airlines since beginning operations in 1992; however, it cannot be attributed to the airline in any way.

See also
List of airlines of Ukraine
Transport in Ukraine

References

External links

Official website (mobile version)

Airlines of Ukraine
Airlines established in 1992
Association of European Airlines members
Government-owned airlines
Ukrainian brands
Privat Group
Ukrainian companies established in 1992